Tylos granulatus is a species of isopod in the family Tylidae. It is found in Africa.

References

Isopoda
Articles created by Qbugbot
Crustaceans described in 1843